The National Citizen Service (NCS) is a voluntary personal and social development program for 15–17 year olds in England and Northern Ireland, funded largely by money from the UK Government. It was formally announced in 2010 by Prime Minister David Cameron as part of the Conservative–Liberal Democrat coalition government's Big Society initiative, and it was launched in England in 2011. After the 2015 general election, the programme was continued under the Conservative government. In October 2016 Cameron, who had resigned as Prime Minister, became chairman of the NCS Trust's patrons' board. The scheme was made permanent through the National Citizen Service Act 2017.

Description
The programme takes place in the spring, summer or autumn coinciding with school holidays. Groups of teenagers undertake a residential visit, usually to an activity centre for an outdoor education-style course in the countryside involving physical and team building activities.  After this, participants undertake a residential phase, gaining a taste of independent living and learning a variety of skills for their future. In the third (and sometimes fourth) phase, participants plan and deliver a "social action" project in their local community, often to raise awareness of or fundraise for a particular cause. Those completing the course receive a certificate at a graduation ceremony. The certificate is signed by the Prime Minister in office at the time of graduation. From 2013 onwards, participants have paid £50 each to take part in the scheme, although there are bursaries for those from low-income households.

History
The programme was designed and piloted in 2009 by social integration charity The Challenge, which remains the largest provider of the programme. It was formally announced in 2010 by Prime Minister David Cameron as part of the Conservative–Liberal Democrat coalition government's Big Society initiative, and it was launched in 2011. When the scheme was launched critics expected it to be an unpopular and unsuccessful non-military version of national service. Subsequently, however, it achieved cross-party support in Parliament.

After the 2015 general election, the programme was continued under the Conservative government. In October 2016 Cameron, who had resigned as Prime Minister, became chairman of the NCS Trust's patrons' board. In the 2016 Queen's Speech it was announced that the scheme would be made permanent through the National Citizen Service Bill which was then introduced into the House of Lords by Lord Ashton of Hyde. The bill received Royal Assent in April 2017 and the resulting National Citizen Service Act created a statutory framework for the programme as part of a £1.26 billion investment programme.

By the end of 2018 more than 400,000 young people had completed the NCS programme.

Finances
The expenditure on the scheme in 2012 was estimated at £1,400 per individual and the scheme received almost half the Office for Civil Society's total budget in 2013. The numbers who took part in the scheme were 26,000 in 2012, 40,000 in 2013, 57,000 in 2014, 75,000 in 2015, 93,000 in 2016  and nearly 99,000 in 2017 meaning one in six eligible teenagers participated.

In January 2017 the National Audit Office reported that the NCS had "weaknesses" in governance and had "not prioritised cost control". It estimated that just 213,000 people would be participating in the programme in 2020–21, compared to a target of 360,000. The report suggested costs would have to be reduced by 29% in order to meet participation targets.

In March 2017 the Public Accounts Committee of the House of Commons said that the high cost of the scheme could not be justified and its participation targets remained challenging despite being significantly reduced. The total expenditure committed to the scheme by the government between 2011/12 and 2019/20 is £1.5 billion. £600 million of this had been spent by April 2017, with £900 million of the expenditure remaining. Research carried out in the spring of 2017 indicated that affluent individuals are less likely to attend university if they take part in NCS, while poorer individuals are more likely to do so. At that time the cost per participant of NCS was £1,863.

In July 2018 the Minister for Sport and Civil Society Tracey Crouch said that in 2016 NCS had spent almost £10m on places which were never filled. In August 2018 the Local Government Association said that in 2016 the number of young people taking part in NCS amounted to 12% of those eligible, and suggested that some of the money could be more effectively spent on local council youth services, spending on which fell from £650 million in 2010–11 to £390 million in 2016–17. Over the four years from 2014–5 to 2017–18 UK government spending on NCS was £634 million which accounted for 95% of all UK government spending on youth services.

Delivery
The National Citizen Service is administered by the NCS Trust. The National Citizen Service Act 2017 enabled the staff and assets of the NCS Trust, a community interest company, to transfer to a royal charter body. Under the legislation, the government is allowed to provide grant-in-aid funding to the NCS trust. The trust is required to publish business plans, accounts and annual reports and the National Audit Office is the trust's auditor. The government has the power to promote the scheme by sending letters to young people as they turn 16 on behalf of the Trust.

The programme is delivered through a number of Regional Delivery Partners (RDPs) and Local Delivery Partners (LDPs).  The following organisations are current Regional Delivery Partners for NCS:

 APM
 The EBP
 English Football League Trust
 Ingeus
 Inspira
 Groundwork 
 Reed in Partnership
 Twin Training Group
 vInspired Education and the National Youth Agency

A supply chain of over 100 organisations is involved in delivering the NCS.  Each RDP is responsible for its team of LDPs and their delivery.

In Wales
A pilot scheme took place in Wales in 2014 and a report examining whether it duplicates or complements existing schemes was commissioned. Cameron urged the Welsh Government to consider taking up the scheme and offering it across Wales.

References

External links

 
2011 establishments in England
Programmes of the Government of the United Kingdom
Youth in the United Kingdom
Organizations established in 2011